Won Min-ji (born February 5, 1991), better known by her stage name Anda and formerly Andamiro, is a South Korean singer and songwriter. She debuted in 2012.

Life and career

Early life 
From a young age, Anda wanted to become a singer. 

Initially, Anda failed the entrance examination for university. The following year, she tried again and passed the entrance examination for the Performing Arts Department at Sungkyunkwan University.

2012: Debut 
In 2012, Anda debuted as Andamiro under Trophy Entertainment with the dance single "Don't Ask" featuring Yang Dong-geun. It earned her the nickname, "Korea's Lady Gaga".

2015: Comeback with "Mastering", "It's Goin' Down" and "Touch" 
In 2015, Anda released a dance single called "Mastering" under Emperor Entertainment Korea. "Mastering" is a medium-tempo song with an EDM beat and an urban R&B style produced by Choi Joon-young.

"It's Goin' Down" is a hip-hop genre song and is a collaboration with The Quiett.

In June, Anda released the single "Touch" and the music video was inspired by Fiona Apple's music video for her song "Criminal".

2017–present: Label changes and What You Waiting For
In August 2017, Anda signed an exclusive contract with Esteem Entertainment before eventually signing to YG Entertainment's subsidiary YGX, in July 2018.

On March 6, 2019, Anda released her first digital single and also the first single under YGX titled "What You Waiting For", on which she collaborated with YG Entertainment's producer R.Tee.

On December 31, 2021, Anda announced that she departed YG Entertainment and was planning to find a new label. A few days later, it was announced that she signed with Sublime Artist Agency.

Discography

Extended plays

Singles

Soundtrack appearances

Filmography

Television series

Television shows

Video appearances

References

External links

1991 births
Living people
Singers from Seoul
South Korean electronic music singers
South Korean dance music singers
South Korean women singer-songwriters
South Korean women pop singers
South Korean female idols
21st-century South Korean singers
21st-century South Korean women singers